Itapetim is the northernmost city in the Brazilian state of Pernambuco. The population in 2020, according with IBGE was 13,553 inhabitants and the total area is 404.82 km².

Geography

 State - Pernambuco
 Region - Sertão Pernambucano
 Boundaries - Paraiba state    (N and E);   São José do Egito   (S);   São José do Egito and Brejinho   (W)
 Area - 404.82 km²
 Elevation - 637 m
 Hydrography - Pajeú River
 Vegetation - Caatinga  hiperxerófila
 Climate - semi arid - hot and dry
 Annual average temperature - 22.6 c
 Distance to Recife - 414 km

Economy

The main economic activity in Itapetim is agribusiness, especially farming of goats, cattle, sheep, pigs, chickens;  and plantations of corn, and beans.

Economic Indicators

Economy by Sector
2006

Health Indicators

References

Municipalities in Pernambuco
Populated places established in 1893
1893 establishments in Brazil